Svati is a feminine Hindu name that is a compound of  +  ('great goer', in reference to its remoteness) meaning 'very beneficent'. Probably referring to its brightness call "the real pearl" in Bhartṛhari's kāvyas. It was the name of one of the wives  of the Moon in Hindu epics and the Sanskrit name of Arcturus as well as of the nakshatra (lunar mansion) associated with Arcturus in Hindu astrology.

See also
Hindu calendar
List of Nakshatras

References

Nakshatra